David Čapek (born 7 May 1997) is a Czech footballer who currently plays for FK Viktoria Žižkov on loan from Sparta Prague as a forward.

Club career

AC Sparta Prague
Čapek made his professional debut for Sparta Prague on 10 April 2016 against Příbram.

References

External links
 AC Sparta Prague official club profile
 
 Eurofotbal profile

1997 births
Living people
Czech footballers
Czech expatriate footballers
Czech Republic youth international footballers
Association football forwards
AC Sparta Prague players
FC Sellier & Bellot Vlašim players
MFK Ružomberok players
FK Viktoria Žižkov players
Czech First League players
Czech National Football League players
Slovak Super Liga players
Expatriate footballers in Slovakia
Czech expatriate sportspeople in Slovakia